The Antholzer Bach (also) is a stream in South Tyrol, Italy.

References 

 Information about the Antholzer Bach in German and Italian.

Rivers of Italy
Rivers of South Tyrol